The Mexican vihuela  is a guitar-like string instrument from 19th-century Mexico with five strings and typically played in mariachi  groups.

Description
Although the Mexican vihuela has the same name as the historical Spanish plucked string instrument, the two are distinct. The Mexican vihuela has more in common with the Timple Canario (see: timple) due to both having five strings and both having vaulted (convex) backs. The Mexican vihuela is tuned similarly to the guitar. The difference is that the open G, the D and the A strings are tuned an octave higher than a guitar thus giving it a tenor sound or a higher pitch. The gauge of the strings and the order in which they are applied is important in producing a soft sound or a punchy bold sound when the instrument is strummed (the strum is called a mánico, and also references rhythmic patterns). The implementation of the vihuela to a mariachi is to give a duet of sorts with the Spanish guitar, one having a low tuning while the vihuela has the higher tuning to complement each other. The optimal spot to strum this instrument is between the sound hole and the point where the fret board or neck meets the body of the instrument. This area is where a pick guard can be installed (the same linear area between the upper and lower bouts closest to the fingerboard.) The Mexican vihuela is a small, deep-bodied rhythm guitar built along the same lines as the guitarrón. The Mexican vihuela is used by Mariachi groups. This instrument is strummed with all of the fingernail tips to produce a rich, full and clear sound of the chords being played. A finger pick (la púa) on the pointer finger and or the second and third fingers, gives it a brighter and clearer sound when strummed. Many vihuela players have longer than normal fingernails on their strumming hand to facilitate their playing technique and to also get a clear crystal sound.

Notes and tuning

The vihuela has five nylon strings in reentrant tuning. Similar to the first five strings of a guitar, but with the third, fourth and fifth an octave above what one might expect.

Tuning: A-D-G-B-E – The A, D, and G are tuned one octave above a guitar.

Sources
 Blattman, Erica et al. (2002). "Mariachi Embraced in Our World"

References

External links
Relatives of the Lute: Vihuela, some collected knowledge of The Lute Society of America, Dartmouth College
Mexican music scores. Music sheets for vihuela in the Mariachi orchestra.

Guitar family instruments
Mexican musical instruments